Étienne Pellot "Montvieux", aka le Renard Basque (the Basque fox), (1 September 1765, Hendaye, France – 1856, Hendaye), was the last known French corsair, renowned for his bravery and success.

He received the Légion d'honneur. Etienne Pellot died in Hendaye in 1856.

Every January, children dress up as corsairs and parade the streets of Hendaye to celebrate the return of Étienne Pellot, the last Basque corsair.

Citations

References
Thierry Sandre, Le Corsaire Pellot - Qui Courut Pour Le Roi Pour La République Et Pour L'empereur Et Qui Était Basque, La Renaissance du livre, 1932 ; Rééd. La Découvrance - juin 2005
Pierre Darrigrand, Contradictions et erreurs sur les exploits du corsaire Pellot
J. Duvoisin, Le dernier des corsaires ou la vie d'Étienne Pellot-Montvieux de Hendaye, 1856

People from Hendaye
French-Basque people
French pirates
Chevaliers of the Légion d'honneur
1765 births
1856 deaths